María del Carmen Pinete Vargas as known as Maru Pinete (born 29 August 1960) is a Mexican politician woman from the Institutional Revolutionary Party. She serves as a deputy to the LXIII Legislature of the Mexican Congress representing the second federal electoral district of Veracruz.

Life
Pinete joined the PRI in 1975 and pursued a career as an elementary school teacher, beginning her teaching career in 1978 and being certified as an elementary school professor in 1982 by the Instituto de Regularización Pedagógica in Xalapa. She joined the Sindicato Nacional de Trabajadores de la Educación in 1980, and she pursued careers in the SNTE as well as in her hometown of Tantoyuca. She presided over the Desarrollo Integral de la Familia in Tantoyuca from 1985 to 1988.

The early- and mid-1990s were a time of intense political activity for Pinete in the SNTE, PRI and local government. In 1991, she began a two-year term as the secretary general of the local SNTE delegation; the next year, she became a national councilor in the SNTE and began a term as the alternate municipal president of Tantoyuca. In 1994, she left her last SNTE post and served briefly in the Veracruz state PRI as the coordinator of social management. The next year, she was elected municipal president of Tantoyuca, serving in that capacity until 1997; during this time, she also became a state-level PRI political councilor for the first time.

After the end of her term as municipal president, Pinete continued to serve in the state government and the PRI. She served as a coordinator in the PRI's Women's Alliance and Confederación Nacional de Organizaciones Populares. In 1999, she was named as a delegate from the National Institute for Adult Education in Veracruz; she oversaw the federalization of the INEA and was the first director general of the resulting new agency, the Veracruz Institute for Adult Education (IVEA), from 2000 to 2004. Additionally, in 2001, she obtained her master's degree in public administration. She left the IVEA in 2004 to become the state subsecretary of political development; she taught for the final time in 2005.

In 2006, voters sent Pinete to the Chamber of Deputies for the LX Legislature, her first elected office in nearly a decade. She presided over the Bicameral Commission for the Library System and the Editorial Council and was the vice president of the chamber's Board of Directors. In addition, she served on commissions dealing with Public Education and Educational Services, Attention to Vulnerable Groups, and Special for Promotion of Digital Access in Mexico. She also served as a national political councilor for the PRI between 2006 and 2009.

After a brief reappearance in PRI politics in 2012 as the first woman to be director of the Territorial Movement for the state of Veracruz, she was returned to the Chamber of Deputies in 2015. In the LXIII Legislature, she is a secretary on the Environment and Natural Resources Commission and serves on those dealing with Rural Development and Public Education and Educational Services. Additionally, in May 2016, she was named president of a special commission for environmental efforts in states with PEMEX facilities.

Personal life
Pinete has four children and is a grandmother.

References

1960 births
Living people
Women members of the Chamber of Deputies (Mexico)
Members of the Chamber of Deputies (Mexico) for Veracruz
Municipal presidents in Veracruz
Institutional Revolutionary Party politicians
20th-century Mexican politicians
20th-century Mexican women politicians
21st-century Mexican politicians
21st-century Mexican women politicians
Politicians from Veracruz
People from Tantoyuca
Deputies of the LXIII Legislature of Mexico